Laikipia County is one of the 47 Counties of Kenya, located on the Equator in the former Rift Valley Province of the Country. Laikipia is a cosmopolitan County and is Listed as County number 31. The county has two major urban centres: Nanyuki to the southeast, and Nyahururu to the southwest. Its County government headquarters town is Nanyuki. The County lies between latitudes 0° 18" South and 0° 51" North and between longitude 36° 11" and 37° 24' East. It borders Samburu County to the North, Isiolo County to the North East, Meru County to the East, Nyeri County to the South East, Nyandarua County to the South, Nakuru County to the South West and Baringo County to the West.

Economic activities in the county consist mainly of tourism and agriculture, chiefly grain crops, ranching and greenhouse horticulture.

The county encompasses the high, dry Laikipia Plateau, and has a cool, temperate climate with both rainy and dry seasons. The county borders Nyandarua, Nyeri, Samburu and Baringo counties.

Demographics 

Laikipia county has a total population of 518,560 of which 259,440 are males, 259,102 females and 18 intersex persons. There are 149,271 household with an average household size of 3.4 persons per household and a population density 54 people per square kilometre.

Administrative and political units

Administrative units 
There are five sub counties, fifteen county assembly wards, fifty two locations.

Sub-Counties 

 Laikipia Central 
 Laikipia East 
 Laikipia North 
 Laikipia West 
 Nyahururu
 Kirima (newly created)
Source

Electoral constituencies 

Laikipia East Constituency
Laikipia West Constituency
Laikipia North Constituency
Source

Political leadership 
Joshua Irungu is the current governor, serving his second and final term as governor. He returned after Ndiritu Muriithi governor defeated him in the 2017 general elections Joshua Irungu, He is deputised by [[Reuben Kamuri, is the current Deputy Governor, after Joshua Irungu did not run a second time with his previous deputy governor Gitonga Kabugi. John Kinyua Nderitu is the senator. He has been in office since 2017, replacing the first senator Godfrey Gitahi Kariuki. 
Jane Kagiri was elected women representative for the county in 2022.
For Laikipia County, the County Executive Committee comprises:-

Source

Members of Parliament 2022-2027 (Laikipia County) 

 Hon. Mwangi Kiunjuri Laikipia East Constituency of the Service Party
 Hon. Wachira Karani  of United Democratic Alliance Member of Parliament Laikipia West Constituency
 Hon. Korere, Sarah Paulata of Jubilee Party Member of Parliament Laikipia North Constituency.

Education 
There are 600 ECD centres 304 primary schools and 99 secondary schools. The county has also 4 teachers training colleges, 9 Youth Polytechnics, 94 adult training institutions and 2 universities.

Health 
There are a total of 100 health facilities in the county with one county referral hospital. County has 883 health personnel of different cadre. The HIV prevalence rate stands at 3.2 per cent.

Transport and communication 
The county is covered by 202.2 km of road network. of this 77.0 km is covered by earth surface, 105.5 km is murram surface and 19.7 km is covered by bitumen.

There are 19 Post Offices with 2,299 installed letter boxes, 2,079 rented letter boxes and 220 vacant letter boxes.

Administrative divisions

The county has three constituencies: 
Laikipia North Constituency
Laikipia West Constituency
Laikipia East Constituency

Population

See also
Marmanet
Samburu County
Isiolo County
Meru County
Nyeri County
Nyandarua County
Nakuru County
Baringo County

External links
 www.laikipia.org
 Office for the Coordination of Humanitarian Affairs – Kenya AdminLevels 1-4
 Laikipia County County Integrated Development Plan

References

 
Counties of Kenya